Ecsenius nalolo, known commonly as the Nalolo in South Africa or the Nalolo blenny in Micronesia, is a species of combtooth blenny in the genus Ecsenius. It is found in coral reefs in the western Indian ocean. It can reach a maximum length of 6.5 centimetres. Blennies in this species feed primarily on plants, including benthic algae and weeds.

References
 Smith, J. L. B.   1959 (May) Fishes of the families Blenniidae and Salariidae of the western Indian Ocean. Ichthyological Bulletin of the J. L. B. Smith Institute of Ichthyology No. 14: 229-252, Pls. 14-18. Department of Ichthyology, Rhodes University, Grahamstown, South Africa.

nalolo
Fish described in 1959